The Chemin River is a river in Grenada.

See also
List of rivers of Grenada

References

https://geonames.nga.mil/gns/html/  GEOnet Names Server]
Grenada map

Rivers of Grenada